The 2008 season of the Esiliiga (the second league of the Estonian football system).

League standings

Relegation play-off
Ajax Lasnamäe and II Liiga Ida/Põhi side TJK Legion will compete in a two-legged relegation play-off for one spot in 2009 Esiliiga.

Season statistics

Top goalscorers
As of 16 November 2008.

See also
 2008 Meistriliiga
 2008 Estonian Lower Leagues

References

Esiliiga seasons
2
Estonia
Estonia